The 1988 United States presidential election in New York took place on November 8, 1988, as part of the 1988 United States presidential election. Voters chose 36 representatives, or electors to the Electoral College, who voted for president and vice president.

New York was won by Democratic Governor Michael Dukakis of Massachusetts with 51.62% of the popular vote over Republican Vice President George H. W. Bush of Texas, who took 47.52%, a victory margin of 4.10%. This result made New York roughly 12% more Democratic than the nation-at-large. Dukakis’ statewide victory is largely attributable to winning four of five boroughs of New York City overall with 66.2% of the vote. However, even though losing the city in a landslide, Bush's 32.8% share of the vote was a relatively respectable showing for a Republican in NYC, particularly in retrospect. In the 8 elections that have followed 1988, Republican presidential candidates have received only 17% to 24% of the vote in New York City.

1988 would mark the end of an era in New York's political history. Since the 1940s, New York had been a Democratic-leaning swing state, usually voting Democratic in close elections, but often by small margins. Republicans would dominate much of upstate New York and populated suburban counties like Nassau County, Suffolk County, and Westchester County. However, they would be narrowly outvoted statewide by the fiercely Democratic and massively populated New York City area, along with some upstate cities like Buffalo, Albany, and the college town of Ithaca. This pattern would endure in 1988 for the final time, allowing Bush to keep the race fairly close, only losing the state to Dukakis by 4%. Bush became the first Republican ever to win the White House without carrying Broome County and the first to win without Montgomery County since Rutherford B. Hayes in 1876. This is the last presidential election in New York where the winning candidate lost the state outside of the five boroughs of New York City.

This was the last election in which a Republican presidential nominee won heavily populated Nassau and Westchester Counties, as well as Monroe, Onondaga, and Ulster Counties, and also the last election in which New York was decided by a single-digit margin. Beginning in 1992, the Democrats would make substantial inroads in the suburbs around New York City as well as parts of upstate, making New York a solid blue state that has gone Democratic by double-digit margins in every election since. Rensselaer County would not vote Republican again until 2016.

Results

Results by county

See also
 United States presidential elections in New York
 Presidency of George H. W. Bush

References

New York
1988
1988 New York (state) elections